Adelaïde Henriette "Ada" den Haan (born 14 May 1941) is a retired Dutch breaststroke swimmer. She dominated the 200m breaststroke event in the 1950s, setting four world records in 1956–1957, one under the old rules and three under the new rules that disallowed long underwater swimming. However, she could not participate in the 1956 Summer Olympics that were boycotted by the Netherlands in protest of the suppression of the Hungarian Revolution by the Soviet Union. She won two European gold medals in 1958, but by 1959 her world record was broken and her dominance faded away. At the 1960 Summer Olympics she was part of the Dutch medley team that broke the Olympic record in the preliminaries; however, they finished fourth in the final. She was also fourth in the individual 200 m breastroke event. She married Martien Swinkels, the coach of the Dutch swimming star Marcel Wouda.

References

External links 

 
 

1941 births
Living people
Olympic swimmers of the Netherlands
Swimmers at the 1960 Summer Olympics
World record setters in swimming
Dutch female freestyle swimmers
Dutch female breaststroke swimmers
Sportspeople from Eindhoven
European Aquatics Championships medalists in swimming